Erpe is a sub-municipality of Erpe-Mere in Flanders on the Molenbeek-Ter Erpenbeek in the Denderstreek in the southeast of East Flanders and belongs to Arrondissement of Aalst. The sub-municipality is bordered by the sub-municipalities of Mere, Ottergem, and Erondegem and the municipalities Lede and Aalst.

History 
Erpe was first mentioned in a document of 1057, although the village is probably much older. The name is derived from the word Erpo. Between the 18th and 19th centuries the population of Erpe grew steadily. In 1769 there were 1032 inhabitants, in 1801 there were 1638 inhabitants, and by 1893 the village had 2394 inhabitants. By the end of the 19th century, there were two water mills in the village, a windmill, two breweries and a vinegar maker.

Landmarks 
There is a water tower of the Tussengemeentelijke Maatschappij der Vlaanderen voor Watervoorziening.

There are two water mills in Erpe, both on the Molenbeek Brook, these being the Cottemmolen and the Van Der Biestmolen.

The Cottemmolen is at the Molenstraat 36. It is an overshot watermill which is  protected. It was originally a wheat mill and an oil mill, but later on it was only a wheat mill.

The Van Der Biestmolen is at Dorpsstraat 3. It is an overshot watermill which is not protected and now functions as a wheat mill.

Sint-Martinus Church can be found in Erpe, which belongs to deanery of Lede.

Tourism 
Through Erpe runs the Molenbeekroute. The Molenbeekroute is a cycle track network, known primarily for the mills of the municipality Erpe-Mere and two brooks that can be found there, which both have the name Molenbeek (mill brook).

Sport 
Erpe had two football clubs FC Edixvelde and FC Oranja Erpe at the Royal Belgian Football Association. The national clubhouse of the motorcycle club Blue Angels in Belgium is in Erpe.

References

Sub-municipalities of Erpe-Mere
Populated places in East Flanders